The 2011 Tampa Bay Storm season is the 24th season for the franchise, their 20th in the Tampa Bay region. The team is coached by Dave Ewart and plays home games at the St. Pete Times Forum on the Amalie Motor Oil Field, sponsored by the Amalie Oil Company.

Standings

Season schedule

Preseason

Regular season
The Storm began the season in New Orleans against the VooDoo on March 11. Their first home game was on March 27 as they hosted the Cleveland Gladiators. On July 23 they will host the San Jose SaberCats in their final regular season game.

Roster

Regular season

Week 1: at New Orleans VooDoo

Week 2: at Utah Blaze

Week 3: vs. Cleveland Gladiators

Week 4: vs. Jacksonville Sharks

Week 5: BYE

Week 6: at Philadelphia Soul

Week 7: vs. Dallas Vigilantes

Week 8: at Milwaukee Mustangs

Week 9: at Orlando Predators

Week 10: vs. Kansas City Command

Week 11: at Spokane Shock

Week 12: BYE

Week 13: at Georgia Force

Week 14: vs. Pittsburgh Power

Week 15: vs. Orlando Predators

Week 16: at Jacksonville Sharks

Week 17: vs. New Orleans VooDoo

Week 18: at Tulsa Talons

Week 19: vs. Georgia Force

Week 20: vs. San Jose SaberCats

References

Tampa Bay Storm
Tampa Bay Storm seasons
Tampa